Christian Hersleb Horneman (10 December 1781 – 22 June 1860) was a Norwegian jurist and elected official. He served as a representative at the Norwegian Constitutional Assembly.

Christian Hersleb Horneman was born in Trondheim, Norway. He attended Trondheim Cathedral School. In 1801, Horneman earned his Cand. Jur. from the University of Copenhagen. In 1810 he was appointed magistrate and town clerk in Kragerø in Telemark. In 1815, Horneman returned to Trondheim where he served as an assessor for the court over the next forty years. He also served as chairman of the supervisory board of Norges Bank from 1832 to 1848.

He represented Kragerø at the Norwegian Constituent Assembly in 1814 where he voted with the independence party (Selvstendighetspartiet). He was elected to the Parliament of Norway, representing Trondheim in 1824, 1827, 1830, 1836 and 1839.

He was married during 1810 with his cousin Fredrikke Horneman (1787-1852) with whom he had nine children. He was a member and later president of the Royal Norwegian Society of Sciences and Letters. He also served as mayor Trondheim.

References

External links
Representantene på Eidsvoll 1814 (Cappelen Damm AS)
 Men of Eidsvoll (eidsvollsmenn)

Related Reading
Holme Jørn (2014) De kom fra alle kanter - Eidsvollsmennene og deres hus  (Oslo: Cappelen Damm) 

1781 births
1860 deaths
People from Trondheim
Mayors of Trondheim
University of Copenhagen alumni
19th-century Norwegian lawyers
Fathers of the Constitution of Norway
Members of the Storting